Olga Limburg (5 April 1881 – 7 March 1970) was a German theater and film actress. She began her artistic career in 1901 with a commitment at the Municipal Theatre of Poznan. Since 1902, she played at several of Berlin's leading theaters including the Tribune, the Metropol Theatre, Berlin , the comedy and the Theater am . During the early part of her theater career, Limburg usually played supporting roles. Later she worked in the "comical oldies" plays.

Career
She also starred in major productions including  (1919), Kean (1921) and Rudolf Meinert-directed Marie Antoinette, the Love of a King (1922). These films achieved her much acclaim as a supporting actress. She continued her acting career through the next decade and starred in talkies like Between Night and Dawn (1931), The Black Forest Girl (both 1933), The Girl Irene (1936) Madame Bovary (1937), Napoleon Is to Blame for Everything, Five Million Look for an Heir (both 1938) and Hurrah! I'm a Father (1939) to name a few. It was during these two decades that the became one of the busiest actresses of the German cinema. She played roles of aunts, neighbors, housekeepers and other women next door. From 1919 to 1955, Limburg appeared in 49 films, including four alongside Heinz Rühmann.

Before her retirement from the film industry she acted in Nannete,  (both 1940), Lord of life and death (1954) and The Heart of St. Pauli (1957). Limburg died on 7 March 1970 just one month before her 89th birthday. Her ashes were buried in the St. Anne's Cemetery.

Selected filmography 

 Cain (1918)
 Prince Cuckoo (1919)
 The Spinning Ball (1919)
 Respectable Women (1920)
 Kean (1921)
 Your Brother's Wife (1921)
 The Three Aunts (1921)
 The Dance of Love and Happiness (1921)
 Marie Antoinette, the Love of a King (1922)
 Your Bad Reputation (1922)
 The Cigarette Countess (1922)
 To the Ladies' Paradise (1922)
 The Love Nest (1922)
 The Big Shot (1922)
 The Marriage of Princess Demidoff (1922)
 The Unknown Tomorrow (1923)
 The Woman on the Panther (1923)
 La Boheme (1923)
 Judith (1923)
 The Love of a Queen (1923)
 The Ancient Law (1923)
 The Little Duke (1924)
 Spring Awakening (1924)
 Dudu, a Human Destiny (1924)
 Zigano (1925)
 The Humble Man and the Chanteuse (1925)
 Hedda Gabler (1925)
 Dancing Mad (1925)
 People to Each Other (1926)
 Her Husband's Wife (1926)
 The Good Reputation (1926)
 The Woman in the Cupboard (1927)
 The Trousers (1927)
 Eva in Silk (1928)
 Give Me Life (1928)
 Charlotte Somewhat Crazy (1928)
 Suzy Saxophone (1928)
 Daughter of the Regiment (1929)
 The Girl with the Whip (1929)
 Men Without Work (1929)
 Painted Youth (1929)
 The Man with the Frog (1929)
 Black Forest Girl (1929)
  Busy Girls (1930)
The Citadel of Warsaw (1930)
 You'll Be in My Heart (1930)
  Terror of the Garrison (1931)
 Elisabeth of Austria (1931)
 The Office Manager (1931)
 Between Night and Dawn (1931)
 My Friend the Millionaire (1932)
 Distorting at the Resort (1932)
 And the Plains Are Gleaming (1933)
 The Black Forest Girl (1933)
 Miss Madame (1934)
 Pygmalion (1935)
 Peter, Paul and Nanette (1935)
 His Late Excellency (1935)
 Lady Windermere's Fan (1935)
 Last Stop (1935)
 The Girl Irene (1936)
 Donogoo Tonka (1936)
 The Night With the Emperor (1936)
 Victoria in Dover (1936)
 Madame Bovary (1937)
 Land of Love (1937)
 The Divine Jetta (1937)
 The Coral Princess (1937)
 Dangerous Game (1937)
 Five Million Look for an Heir (1938)
 I Love You (1938)
 The Night of Decision (1938)
 Napoleon Is to Blame for Everything (1938)
 Target in the Clouds (1939)
 The Merciful Lie (1939)
 Renate in the Quartet (1939)
 Hurrah! I'm a Father (1939)
 The Right to Love (1939)
 Nanette (1940)
 Herz ohne Heimat (1940)
 Diesel (1942)
 With the Eyes of a Woman (1942)
 Meine Freundin Josefine (1942)
  The Court Concert (1948)
 Don't Dream, Annette (1949)
 The Staircase (1950)
 Not Without Gisela (1951)
 Turtledove General Delivery (1952)
 We'll Talk About Love Later (1953)
 The Cousin from Nowhere (1953)
  The Seven Dresses of Katrin (1954)
 The Witch (1954)
 Master of Life and Death (1955)
 The Priest from Kirchfeld (1955)
 The Heart of St. Pauli (1957)

References

Bibliography 

 Kulik, Karol. Alexander Korda: The Man Who Could Work Miracles. Virgin Books, 1990.

External links 

 

1881 births
1970 deaths
20th-century German actresses
German film actresses
German silent film actresses
German stage actresses
Actors from Düsseldorf